Xialu District is an administrative district of the prefecture-level city of Huangshi, Hubei province, People's Republic of China. It is a fairly small industrial and residential district, located to the west of Huangshi's downtown Huangshigang District. Since changes in May 2011, the district has been divided into four township-level divisions including Tuanchengshan Subdistrict.

References

County-level divisions of Hubei
Huangshi